Brachmia opaca is a moth in the family Gelechiidae. It was described by Edward Meyrick in 1927. It is found in China and Taiwan.

Adults are externally identical to Autosticha modicella and Autosticha truncicola.

References

Moths described in 1927
Brachmia
Taxa named by Edward Meyrick
Moths of Asia